Simran is an Indian actress and producer known for her works in Tamil films. She has also appeared in Telugu, Hindi, Malayalam and Kannada films. She is well noted for her dancing and acting skills in the Indian film industry. After her marriage, Simran took a break from acting in films and moved on to the small screen where she acted in Jaya TV's serial Simran Thirai, which consisted of mini-serials all featuring Simran and included many popular stars such as Ramji, Raaghav, Saakshi Siva and Abitha playing supporting roles. In 2009, she started acting in the Telugu serial Sundarakanda, telecast on Gemini TV, where she did a guest role. The serial was dubbed in Tamil as Sundarakandam and telecast on Polimer TV. In 2012, she hosted Jackpot, a game show on Jaya TV which was earlier hosted by Khushbu and Nadhiya. She acted in Agni Paravai, a serial telecast in Puthuyugam TV. She played as a main judge on the reality show Dance Tamizha Dance, which was produced by her and her husband Mr Deepak Bagga for Zee Tamizh.

Simran made a return in 2008 with Okka Magadu, opposite Balakrishna, John Appa Rao 40 plus and Seval. Her role as Suriya's wife and mother in Gautham Vasudev Menon's Vaaranam Aayiram was critically acclaimed and she won Filmfare and Vijay awards for the same. She starred in the Tamil films TN-07 AL 4777 and Ainthaam Padai in 2009. She made a brief appearance in Aaha Kalyanam in 2014 and Trisha Illana Nayanthara in 2015. In October 2015, after the successful completion of two seasons of "Dance Tamizha Dance" in her own production, Simran and her husband set up a production studio called Simran & Sons, and launched two new film projects. In 2018, she was approached to play a negative role by Ponram opposite Siva Karthikeyan in Seemaraja.
In July 2018, Sun Pictures announced that Simran had joined the cast in their production venture Petta for the first time in her career to play opposite Rajinikanth, to be directed by the notable director Karthik Subbaraj.

Tamil

Telugu

Hindi

Malayalam

Kannada

Television

See also
 List of awards and nominations received by Simran

References

External links 
 

Indian filmographies
Actress filmographies